The following localities in Skåne were granted a charter and town privileges, mostly by the Danish king, as the province was under Danish rule up until the Treaty of Roskilde in 1658:

The local government reform of 1863 created the concept of municipalities in Sweden. The localities with town privileges were instituted as municipalities with the title of stad (city/town). In the province of Skåne they were: Ängelholm, Helsingborg, Kristianstad, Landskrona, Lund, Malmö, Simrishamn, Skanör med Falsterbo and Ystad. Trelleborg which had lost its privileges in 1619 got the title in 1867.

During the 20th century these localities were instituted as städer:

After 1951 no more städer were instituted and the local government reform of 1971 saw the abolishment of the term, replacing it with kommun for all municipalities, regardless of former status.

Today there is no official definition, but in some contexts (such as Sveriges Nationalatlas) localities with over 10,000 inhabitants are regarded as cities.

Urban areas in order of size
Below is a list of localities in Skåne County with a population greater than 10,000 as of 2005.

 Malmö, 258,020 (Malmö Municipality and Burlöv Municipality)
 Helsingborg, 91,457
 Lund, 76,188
 Kristianstad, 33,083
 Landskrona, 28,670
 Trelleborg, 25,643
 Ängelholm, 22,532
 Hässleholm, 17,730
 Ystad, 17,286
 Eslöv, 16,551
 Staffanstorp, 13,783
 Höganäs, 13,401
 Höllviken, 10.014 (Vellinge Municipality)

See also
Stad (Sweden)
Municipalities of Sweden
Urban areas in Sweden

Towns in Skane